Speculoos is a biscuit originally manufactured in Belgium. Although the name is similar to speculaas, speculoos is a different product. The biscuits are made without the mixture of spices used in speculaas.  

The main ingredients of speculoos are wheat flour, candy syrup (from beet sugar), fat, and sometimes cinnamon. 
 
Fewer spices are involved in the process of making Belgian speculoos compared to the Dutch speculaas, as the spices were much more expensive to import to Belgium as opposed to the Netherlands. Speculoos was developed in the 20th century around the area of Verviers and made as an alternative for people who could not afford Dutch speculaas. The origins of speculaas are much older. In the 2020s the names speculaas and speculoos are sometimes used interchangeably in Flanders.

Brands 
In Europe, Lotus Speculoos is the most recognized brand. This manufacturer supplied the biscuits individually packaged to the catering industry. In the United States and the United Kingdom, the same company is branded as Lotus Biscoff, short for biscuit with coffee. In October 2020, Lotus Bakeries decided to omit the word "speculoos" from local markets, to harmonise their brand. Several chains of supermarkets have started their own product under their generic name. In the US, windmill or almond windmill cookies are mostly based on Speculoos.

Spread or paste 
Workers in the Low Countries traditionally made a sandwich in the morning with butter and speculaas or speculoos cookies. This would develop into a spread-like consistency by lunchtime. In 2008, two competitors entered a contest on the Belgian television show, The Inventors (de Bedenkers), with a spread made from speculoos cookies — Els Scheppers, who reached the semi-finals, and the team of chef Danny De Mayer and Dirk De Smet, who were not selected as finalists. Spreads made from crushed Speculoos cookies went into production by three separate companies and become popular.

By 2007, several Belgian companies began marketing a speculoos paste, now available worldwide under various brands and names: as Speculla, Cookie Butter, and Biscoff Spread. As a form of spreadable Speculoos cookies, the flavor is caramelized and gingerbread-like, with a color similar to peanut butter and a consistency ranging from creamy to granular or crunchy. The spread consists of 60% crushed speculoos cookies along with vegetable oils. In the United States, the California-based and German-owned variety grocery store chain Trader Joe's sells their own brand of cookie butter, a thick buttery paste made up of the cookies, as well as their own cookie butter ice cream.

References

External link

Biscuits